INO80 complex subunit B is a protein that in humans is encoded by the INO80B gene.

Function

This gene encodes a subunit of an ATP-dependent chromatin remodeling complex, INO80, which plays a role in DNA and nucleosome-activated ATPase activity and ATP-dependent nucleosome sliding. Readthrough transcription of this gene into the neighboring downstream gene, which encodes WW domain-binding protein 1, generates a non-coding transcript.

References

Further reading